Carl Blos (24 November 1860, Mannheim - 19 November 1941, Munich) was a German portrait, landscape and genre painter.

Life and work
He began his art lessons from 1878 to 1880, at the Kunstgewerbeschule (arts and crafts school) in Karlsruhe. From 1881 to 1883, he continued his studies at the Academy of Fine Arts there, under the direction of Karl Hoff. By 1887, he had completed his studies at the Academy of Fine Arts, Munich, where his primary instructor was Wilhelm  Lindenschmit. During his last two years there, he was also employed in Lindenschmit's workshop.

He was awarded the Academy's medal in 1884, and received a small gold medal at the Große Berliner Kunstausstellung of 1896.
  
Later, he became a member of the moderately progressive . In 1902, he was named a Professor at his alma mater, the Munich Academy.

In 1905, he was awarded the Großen Medaille in 1905, and the Lenbach Prize of the city of Munich in 1937. Several works of his were sold at the Große Deutsche Kunstausstellung of 1939, an exhibition meant to highlight art that was approved by the Nazi Party.

Sources 
 Ludwig Tavernier, "Blos, Carl", In: Allgemeines Lexikon der Bildenden Künstler von der Antike bis zur Gegenwart, Vol. 4: Bida–Brevoort, Wilhelm Engelmann, Leipzig 1910 (Online)
 "Carl Blos", In: Hans Vollmer (Ed.): Allgemeines Lexikon der bildenden Künstler des XX. Jahrhunderts. Vol.1: A–D.,  E. A. Seemann, Leipzig 1953, pg.236
 "Blos, Carl" In: Allgemeines Künstlerlexikon. Die Bildenden Künstler aller Zeiten und Völker, Vol.11, Saur, 1995, pg.604 
 Horst Ludwig: "Blos, Carl". In: Horst Ludwig (Ed.): Münchner Maler im 19. Jahrhundert. Vol.1, Verlag F. Bruckmann, München 1981, pg.102

External links 

 More works by Blos @ ArtNet
 

1860 births
1941 deaths
19th-century German painters
19th-century German male artists
German portrait painters
German genre painters
Academy of Fine Arts, Munich alumni
Academic staff of the Academy of Fine Arts, Munich
Artists from Mannheim
20th-century German painters
20th-century German male artists